The 2012 Malaysia Cup (Malay: Piala Malaysia 2012) was the 86th edition of Malaysia Cup. The competition began on 24 August 2012 and ended on 20 October 2012 with the final, held at Shah Alam Stadium. A total of 16 teams took part in the competition. The teams were divided into four groups, each containing four teams. The group leaders and runners-up teams in the groups after 6 matches qualified to the quarterfinals.

Negeri Sembilan FA were the defending champions, having beaten Terengganu FA 2–1 in last season's final.

For the first time since 1994, a Singapore team took part in the competition under the name LIONSXII.

Format 
In this competition, the top 12 teams from 2012 Malaysia Super League is joined by the top 4 teams from 2012 Malaysia Premier League. The teams will be drawn into four groups of four teams.

As part of the agreement between Football Association of Malaysia and Football Association of Singapore, a Singapore team will participate in Malaysia Cup. This marks the comeback of the Singapore team in Malaysia Cup having last participated 18 years before in 1994, where they won the competition, as the Singapore Lions. The new team will be known as LIONSXII.

Seeding 
The 16 teams were divided into four pots for the draw, each containing four teams. The standings in Super League and Premier League 2012 ended on 14 July 2012 – was used to seed the teams.

Group stage

Group A

Group B

Group C

Group D

Knockout stage

Bracket

Quarterfinals
The first legs were played on 25,28 and 29 September, and the second legs were played on 2 October 2012.

First leg

Second leg

LIONSXII won aggregate 3–2.

ATM FA won aggregate 6–3.

Kelantan FA won aggregate 4–3.

Selangor FA won aggregate 5–2.

Semi-finals
The first legs were played on 5 & 6 October, and the second legs were played on 11 & 12 October 2012.

First leg

Second leg

Aggregate 2-2, ATM FA won penalty shoot-out 5–4.

Kelantan FA won aggregate 3–0.

Final

The final was played on 20 October 2012 at the Shah Alam Stadium, Shah Alam in Selangor, Malaysia.

Winners

Statistics

Top Scorer

References

2012 in Malaysian football
Malaysia Cup seasons